Stanislav Kišš (born 16 December 1978 in Prešov) is a professional Slovak football defender who currently plays for TJ Rozvoj Pušovce.

Career statistics

Last updated: 28 December 2009

External links
 Player profile at mfkkosice.sk

1978 births
Living people
Slovak footballers
FC Steel Trans Ličartovce players
FC VSS Košice players
Slovak Super Liga players
MFK Vranov nad Topľou players
FK Železiarne Podbrezová players
Association football fullbacks
Sportspeople from Prešov